Among those who were born in the Royal Borough of Kingston upon Thames, or have dwelt within the borders of the modern borough are (in alphabetical order):

Kingston upon Thames (town)

 Joss Ackland, actor, lived at Ravenswood Court in Coombe
 Clara Amfo, radio presenter (1984)
 Nigel Barley, anthropologist (1947)
 Cyril Joe Barton, World War II hero
 Harold Bauer, pianist, born 1873
 Erin Boag, professional ballroom dancer and star of Strictly Come Dancing (1975)
 Sydney James Bounds (1920–2006), author
 Derek Bourgeois, composer (1941)
 Tom Brown, satirist (1662–1704), lived at Kingston for three years when schoolmaster there
 Timothy Browning, mathematician
 John Bryant, journalist
 Richard Butler, lead singer of The Psychedelic Furs (1957)
 Donald Campbell, car and motorboat racer (1921)
 John Cleland, author (1709)
 Finn Cole, actor (1995)
 Joe Cole, actor (1988)
 Terence Conran, industrial designer, restaurateur, retailer and writer
 Matt Cooke, television presenter (1982)
 John Cooper, auto engineer (1923)
 Peter Cox, lead singer Go West (band) (1955)
 Victoria Crowe, painter (1945)
 William Daniell (1769), artist and engraver
 Sandy Denny, singer and musician
 Es Devlin, stage designer (1971)
 Chris Dreja, guitar, bass, and keyboards with 1960s band The Yardbirds (1963-1968) Box of Frogs (1983-1986)
 Lisa Faulkner (1973), actor 
 Archibald Frazer-Nash (1889), engineer and car designer
 Nell Tiger Free (1999), actress
 John Galsworthy (1867–1933), author
 George Fisher Gilmour (1904–1984), artist, playwright, and filmmaker
 Dora Gordine (1895–1991), sculptor, lived at Dorich House (c 1937-1991), Kingston Vale, which is now a museum. 
 Pamela Green (1929–2010), glamour model, was born in Kingston
 Earl Haig (1861–1928), World War I general, lived at Ravenswood Court in Coombe 
 Edward Highmore (1961), actor
 Herbert Hill (1867), cricketer
 Neon Hitch, singer (1986)
 Tom Holland (1996), actor
 John Hoyland, artist, built and worked from a studio in Kingston upon Thames from 1964 
 Len Hutton (1916), English Test cricketer
 John Inverdale (1957), BBC broadcaster, born in Plymouth, but residing in Kingston upon Thames from 1964
 P.D.James author, resident 1961-1966 
 Stuart Latham (1912), first producer of Coronation Street
 Dean Lewington, footballer (1984)
 Sarah Lindsay (1980), Olympic speed skater
 Margaret Lockwood (1916–1990), actress, born in Karachi but lived her later years in Kingston 
 Gren Lucas (1935-2022), Botanist and Conservationist at the Royal Botanic Gardens, Kew. From 1995 lived at Hornchurch Close, Ham, Kingston upon Thames.
 John Martyn, singer, guitarist and songwriter (1948)
 Debbie McGee, television presenter and magician (1958)
 Jonny Lee Miller (1972), actor
 Jeremy Moon (1934), artist
 Ivor Moreton (1908–1984), pianist and singer, lived in Coombe.
 Nicky Morgan, (1972) politician
 Eadweard Muybridge (1830), photographer
 Ingrid Newkirk (1949) founder of PETA
 Chiké Okonkwo (1982), actor
 Tom Onslow-Cole, British racing driver (1987)
 Mike Osborn (1917), military officer
Katherine Parkinson (1978), actress
 Roy Plomley (1914), radio broadcaster, producer, playwright 
 George Yeomans Pocock (1891), boatbuilder
"Rat Scabies" (Christopher Millar), drummer for The Damned (1957)
 Steven Reid, footballer (1981)
 Kelly Reilly (1977), actor
 Declan Rice, footballer for West Ham United and the England national team (1999)
 Lynn Ripley a.k.a. Twinkle (singer) (1948)
 Patrick Roberts, professional footballer (1997)
 Tom Rowlands of the Chemical Brothers (1971)
Anna Rust (1995), actor
 James Saunders, composer (1972)
 Luke Shaw, footballer for Manchester United F.C. (1995)
 Lucie Silvas, singer (1977)
 Tim Smith, singer and guitarist for Cardiacs (1961-2020)
 James Squire, transported convict and brewer in Australia (1754)
 Alec Stewart, former England cricket captain
 Stormzy, rapper, lives in Kingston 
 Dave Swarbrick, folk fiddle player (1941)
 Lynne Truss, author, born in Kingston upon Thames in 1955 
 Jacqueline Wilson, grew up and went to school in Kingston and still lives there today
 Steven Wilson, musician (1967)

References

 
Kingston